Man from Montreal is a 1939 American Western film directed by Christy Cabanne. It stars Richard Arlen, Andy Devine, and Kay Sutton, and was released on December 8, 1939.

Cast list
 Richard Arlen as Clark Manning
 Andy Devine as Constable "Bones" Blair
 Kay Sutton as Myrna Montgomery
 Anne Gwynne as Doris Blair
 Reed Hadley as Ross Montgomery
 Addison Richards as Captain Owens
 Joe Sawyer as Biff Anders
 Jerry Marlowe as Jim Morris
 Tom Whitten as Brad Owens
 Eddy Waller as Old Jacques

References

External links 
 
 
 

Films directed by Christy Cabanne
Universal Pictures films
1939 Western (genre) films
American Western (genre) films
Films set in Canada
Films scored by Hans J. Salter
1939 drama films
1939 films
1930s English-language films
1930s American films